By the end of Portuguese rule, Macau was administratively divided into two municipalities and seven civil parishes. Parishes were administrative subdivisions of the municipalities. After the 1999 handover to China, parishes are still officially recognized divisions but for symbolic reasons only.

Parishes were formerly administrative divisions falling under the former two municipalities of Macau: Macau and Ilhas. Following the 1999 transfer of sovereignty over Macau from Portugal to China, these municipalities were formally abolished on 31 December 2001 by Law No. 17/2001. While their administrative functions have since been removed, these parishes are still retained nominally. Since the abolition of the municipalities, some of the municipal services are now handled by the Municipal Affairs Bureau.

Parishes

Prior to the dissolution of the municipalities in 2001, the first five parishes listed in the table below fell under the municipality of Macau while the remaining two fell under the municipality of Ilhas, totalling to 7 parishes.

The parishes of Nossa Senhora do Carmo and São Francisco Xavier are coterminous with the natural borders of the islands of Taipa and Coloane, respectively.

Former municipalities
Each municipality was run by a municipal chamber, with a supervising municipal assembly.

See also

Municipal Affairs Bureau
Geography of Macau

References

 01
Geography of Macau
Municipalities of Macau
Populated places in Macau